Begumpur is a Village is located in Rohini, North West district in the UT of Delhi, India. It is surrounded by different sectors of Rohini i.e. Rohini sec-22, Rohini sec-32, Rohini sec-33, Rohini sec-37 and Rohini sec-38. Begumpur is the village of Yadav's. The village is home to famous D.  This village has very ancient temple namely “Prachin Shiv Mandir”, “ Dada Bhero Mandir” and “ Shri Shyam ji”. There is vary famous temple of  “Hanuman Ji” nearby the entrance of the Village. 
A very big statue of Lord Hanuman can be seen there. Local language of this village is Haryanvi. People are highly supportive. 
This village has mostly all facilities like Good Roads, Water supply, electricity is at the Par. 
Begumpur has a very big Market where anyone can find all the required things. 
 
It is easy to reach there by Metro, Bus or Auto.
The nearest metro station is Rithala metro station on the red line.

The office of the Deputy Commissioner of Police (Rohini) is situated at Begumpur Police Station in Sector 23, Rohini.

Demographics
 India census, Begum Pur had a population of 22,828. Males constitute 55% of the population and females 45%. Begum Pur has an average literacy rate of 64%, higher than the national average of 59.5%; with 54% of the males and 46% of females literate. 19% of the population is under 6 years of age.

References

Cities and towns in North West Delhi district